Buffalo Township is an inactive township in Pike County, in the U.S. state of Missouri.

Buffalo Township was erected in 1819, taking its name from Buffalo Creek.

References

Townships in Missouri
Townships in Pike County, Missouri